In numerical analysis Chebyshev–Gauss quadrature is an extension of Gaussian quadrature method for approximating the value of integrals of the following kind:

and

In the first case

where

and the weight

In the second case

where

and the weight

See also
Chebyshev polynomials
Chebyshev nodes

References

External links
 Chebyshev-Gauss Quadrature from Wolfram MathWorld
 Gauss–Chebyshev type 1 quadrature and Gauss–Chebyshev type 2 quadrature, free software in C++, Fortran, and Matlab.

Numerical integration (quadrature)